The Definitive Act is a studio album by Tsunami Bomb, released in 2004.

Track listing
 "Dawn on a Funeral Day" – 3:08
 "Being Alright" – 3:03
 "5150" – 2:44
 "Safety Song" – 2:12
 "I Bought You" – 3:13
 "4 Robots and an Evil Scientist" – 1:24
 "A Lonely Chord" – 3:58
 "Epic" – 3:33
 "Negative One to Ten" – 3:04
 "My Machete" – 2:54
 "Tetanus Shot" – 2:45
 "Jigsaw" – 4:21

References

Tsunami Bomb albums
2004 albums